Jill Tracy is a composer, singer, pianist, storyteller and "musical evocateur" based in San Francisco.

Known for her dark, evocative, cinematic style, Jill Tracy states that some of her biggest childhood influences were film score composers such as Bernard Herrmann, and classic suspense tales, including Alfred Hitchcock and Fritz Lang films, Ray Bradbury stories, and Rod Serling's The Twilight Zone. In an interview, she stated, "I learned from watching 'The Twilight Zone' that often it was what you didn’t see that really put the fear in you... How a story could evoke such emotion and response essentially revealing so little. I abide by that in my approach to music. It’s the breath, the spaces between the notes and the arrangements that make the work come alive. The Soul lives in the silence."

She thinks of her music as a portal, a "way-in" and calls this seductive and magical place she inhabits the "elegant side of the netherworld."

LA Weekly describes her work: "Think of Jill Tracy’s music as the soundtrack for Union Station filmed in black and white during the eerie build-up to a startlingly romantic plot twist. She has a voice that prompts images of spirits haunting art deco hallways and a knack for writing songs that unfold like the story lines of F.W. Murnau movies that were never made."

Jill Tracy is listed in San Francisco Magazine'''s Top 100 Creative Forces in the Bay Area, has been awarded "Best of the Bay" by the San Francisco Bay Guardian, and has been nominated for two California Music Awards and SF Weekly Music Awards.

She has been hailed a "bad-ass icon" by SFist and "a femme fatale for the thinking man" by the San Francisco Chronicle, which is a moniker that is now frequently used to describe her.

“My life’s work has always been about honoring the Mystery, the forgotten—those stories and places lost through Time," she explains. "It’s vital to preserve a sense of marvel and wonder now in a world trying its best to destroy, mock, or debunk it. It’s my purpose to be a beacon, a tether to these places. And the greatest thing I can do is to transport my audience there with me—just by listening."

 Career 

Following her 1996 solo debut CD Quintessentially Unreal, Tracy released Diabolical Streak (1999), her first studio album featuring The Malcontent Orchestra. The song "Evil Night Together" was awarded the SIBL international Grand Prize for songwriting.  The album was listed among the "Top 10 Neo-Cabaret albums of all time" in Shift magazine. "Evil Night Together" has been featured on the CBS show NCIS, the feature film "Dr. Jekyll and Mr. Hyde" (2008), and Showtime chose the tune to promote the final season of Dexter (2013) in a promo entitled "The Final Symphony."

"The Fine Art of Poisoning," also from Diabolical Streak, became an animated short film in 2003, a collaboration with Bay Area animator Bill Domonkos. "The Fine Art of Poisoning" has garnered film festival awards internationally, including Best Experimental Film in the 2003 New Orleans Film Festival and the 2003 Empire Film Festival in Buffalo, NY, as well as Best Music Video in both the 2003 Cineme – Chicago International Animation Festival and the Seattle International Film Festival.

Clive Barker became a fan of her work after seeing "The Fine Art of Poisoning" and called it "both seductive and terrifying." FEARnet licensed "The Fine Art of Poisoning" in 2012 as part of their permanent short film collection.

Jill Tracy and The Malcontent Orchestra's original score to F.W. Murnau’s 1922 silent vampire classic Nosferatu debuted live at San Francisco's Foreign Cinema in 1999 and toured Northern California theatres during Halloween season for five consecutive years.  This led to the 2002 CD release Into the Land of Phantoms, selections from the Nosferatu score.

Jill Tracy released her fourth album, The Bittersweet Constrain, in 2008, produced by Alex Nahas. This album has a heavier sonic edge with the addition of exotic instruments such as the sarod, harmonium, and Chapman Stick. The remixed instrumental arrangements were released as a follow-up album, Beneath: the Bittersweet Constrain (2011). The surreal sepia portraits of Jill Tracy on the album are by outsider photographer Michael Garlington. Nature and taxidermy imagery are featured in the album artwork. Peculiar photos of Jill Tracy having a tea party in a garden with taxidermied animals, including birds, dogs, a two-headed calf, and a monkey were shot in the backyard of renowned taxidermist and collector Tia Resleure.

From 2000 to 2015, Jill Tracy performed as "Belle of the Ball," headlining the wildly popular Edwardian Ball, an annual lavish costumed event in San Francisco and Los Angeles, drawing thousands of spectators worldwide in homage to artist Edward Gorey.

Since 2015, she has been a headlining performer in the annual Flower Piano Festival, which draws 60,000 people a year to San Francisco Botanical Garden in Golden Gate Park.

She began collaborating and performing with David J (Bauhaus, Love and Rockets) in 2009, releasing two singles in 2010. Accompanying him on piano during live concerts, she developed a post-classical cinematic version of "Bela Lugosi's Dead," and composed a lavish 2-minute solo piano intro which gradually revealed the rhythm of the classic tune as the band joined in. This was released as "Bela Lugosi's Dead (Undead is Forever)" by "David J (with Jill Tracy)" in 2013.  "We recorded practically in pitch darkness," Jill says of the session, which was captured live in a single take. "That's why there is such a gorgeous, seductive urgency to the piece: the band could only hear… and feel… and react."

“Back during the recording of The Bittersweet Constrain, my engineer Alex Nahas kept referring to my signature dark grand style of playing as ‘Bauthoven,' I loved that phrase. This seemed to be an unknowing foreshadow of what Fate had in store," she noted, "as I did not even know David at that time."

In 2019, she was invited by Bauhaus frontman Peter Murphy to be the opening act for his historical San Francisco and New York City residencies, as well as several of his iconic shows on the Ruby Tour, celebrating 40 Years of Bauhaus (with bassist David J). She got to perform with the band, performing her original piano arrangements on "Bela Lugosi’s Dead," as well as "Who Killed Mr. Moonlight."

Location-based projects and the Sonic Séance

Joining forces with the Atlanta-based violinist Paul Mercer in 2007, the two have become revered for their unique traveling show "The Musical Séance," featuring channeled duets on piano and violin. Music is manifested via tales, objects, and treasured artifacts brought in by the audience, their energy, and emotions.

With her affinity for odd history tales, and unexpected inspirations, Jill Tracy is known for researching and composing alone at a piano in mysterious locales. using the history, energy, frequency, resonant tones, and emotion of an environment to uncover spontaneous music. She calls these projects "The Sonic Séance," her own singular approach of "musical excavation" or "sonic archeology." These projects are done both with and without an audience.
She has conjured music at Victoria, B.C.'s landmark 1890 Craigdarroch Castle, San Francisco Conservatory of Flowers, abandoned asylums, mansions, cemeteries, and has worked with the San Francisco Botanical Garden since 2015 presenting her Sonic Séance live at night to audiences inside the Ancient Redwood Grove and the Garden of Fragrance, among others.

In an interview with Haute Macabre, she stated: “There is a hidden score all around us…Everything (and everyone) vibrates, holds a unique frequency, and maintains a charge— an actual residue, or talisman of Time. As humans, we are constantly interacting with, influenced by this energy, but most often fail to realize it. The Sonic Séance allows me to manifest the true magick and energy of moment and place."

Jill Tracy is the first musician in history to receive a grant from the renowned Mütter Museum in Philadelphia (Francis C. Wood Institute), the nation's foremost collection of medical oddities. She is creating a musical work inspired by the Mütter collection, and her experiences after-dark inside the museum. She spent nights alone composing music amidst the Mütter's vast collection of skeletons and specimens—which include renowned "Siamese Twins" Chang and Eng, Einstein's brain, Harry Eastlack "The Ossified Man," books bound in human skin, and The Mermaid Baby. This in-progress project (which began in 2102) is called "The Teratology Lullabies."

She was invited by San Francisco's historical Presidio Trust to research its archives and tour abandoned military buildings (dating back to 1776) with old records of supernatural occurrence. She interviewed over 50 Presidio employees, revealing their first-hand ghostly encounters spanning decades. This became her acclaimed stage show "Legends of the Presidio Ghosts," which premiered in the famed Presidio Officers Club Ballroom, featuring music composed on-site inspired her discoveries. For the past three years, it has developed into a nighttime lantern walking tour for visitors, as Jill Tracy guides them to the haunted locations, shares their stories, and performs a Sonic Séance live.

She is currently in the middle of another unprecedented project (which began in 2017)—a musical excavation of mysterious Lily Dale, the small, private town of mediums and Spiritualists in upstate New York. While living in the home of a renowned Lily Dale medium, she recorded her singular piano music channeled at night inside the original 1883 town auditorium, site of séances and spirit communication services for over a century. She captured field recordings from known vortex points including the mystical Leolyn Woods, to nighttime thunderstorms and birds to create an authentic, never-before-heard sonic journey into this historical little "town that talks to the dead." This will be released as a musical album and accompanying book called The Secret Music of Lily Dale."Music is a ghost," Jill Tracy told Haute Macabre.  "It’s an intangible thing—you can’t touch it, you have to record it to prove it was ever there. Music is time travel. It only exists moment by moment, note by note—and then vanishes. We can try to catch it, like a mythical beast or a falling star. But the only way it truly can exist is to archive it—recordings, videos, sheet music. The real music itself is a ghost."

Discography
AlbumsQuintessentially Unreal (1996)Diabolical Streak (1999)Into the Land of Phantoms (2002)The Bittersweet Constrain (2008)BENEATH: The Bittersweet Constrain (2011)Silver Smoke, Star of Night (Christmas album 2012)A Medicine for Madness: The 2020 Collection (2020)

EPs and Singles
Under the Fate of the Blue Moon (single 2011)Lament for the Queen of Disks (single 2014)Evocations of the Moon (4 track EP 2020)Seclusion 22 / Whispers Behind the Glass (2 track EP 2020)The Dark Day (3 track EP 2020)Elegy for a Solitary Year (single 2020)

Compilations"Meantime" on Market Street, Best of Café du Nord (live) (2000)"Evil Night Together" on SIBL (Songs Inspired by Literature) Artists for Literacy (2002)"Evil Night Together" on Projekt's A Dark Cabaret (2005)"Torture" on The Sepiachord Companion (2009)"In Between Shades" on Projekt's A Dark Cabaret 2 (2011)"Coventry Carol" on Projekt's Ornamental (2012)"Totenmesse (The Colour of the Flame)" on Songs of Decadence: A Soundtrack to the Writings of Stanisław Przybyszewski (2013)

Collaborations"Blood Sucker Blues / Tidal Wave Of Blood" by David J. + Shok (2010)"Bela Lugosi's Dead (Undead is Forever)" with David J. (2013)

FilmsIn the Wake (2001) Jill Tracy narrates the film, the song "Extraordinary" is featured in the score.The Fine Art of Poisoning (2003) short film collaboration/music video project with animator Bill Domonkos.Heavy Put Away (2003) appears as nightclub singer, performed piano score, "Evil Night Together" is the film's end title song. (FOX Searchlight)Ice Cream Ants (2006) stars as the sinister Mona, performed/composed title song "Pulling Your Insides Out." (director: Jeremy Carr)The Black Dahlia (2007) composed/performed the song "Pulling Your Insides Out."NERVOUS96 (2011) Jill Tracy and violinist Paul Mercer scored this surreal short from filmmaker Bill DomonkosOther Madnesses  (2015) Jill Tracy composed/performed the end title song "Dreamland," a haunting, melancholy remake of the 1904 tune "All Aboard For Dreamland." (director: Jeremy Carr)

TV
 Dr. Jekyll and Mr. Hyde (Ion Network) – features Jill Tracy's song "Evil Night Together".
 Jekyll (BBC) – features "Evil Night Together".
 NCIS (CBS-TV) Episode "Ravenous" – features "Evil Night Together".
 The History Detectives (PBS)- features Jill Tracy's song "The Fine Art of Poisoning."
 Showtime Networks chose "Evil Night Together" to promote the final season (8) of Dexter, "The Final Symphony".

Written WorksThe Keeper of the Shop- published in Morbid Curiosity Magazine No. 6The Next Best Thing to Stevie Nicks- published in Morbid Curiosity Magazine No. 8The Keeper of the Shop- published in anthology Morbid Curiosity Cures the Blues (Scribner 2009)At Louche Ends''- Jill Tracy writes foreword for Maria Alexander poetry collection (Burning Effigy Press 2011))

References

External links

Jill Tracy official website

Jill Tracy on Bandcamp

Interviews
Mysteria Woman:  Jill Tracy interview in Metropolitan Magazine
Woman of Mystery: Jill Tracy Interview in SFist
A Musical Seance: Jill Tracy Interview in San Francisco Chronicle
Haunted by the Thought of Jill Tracy: Coilhouse article
I'll Hold Your Hand While They Drag the River: An Interview with Jill Tracy in TOR
Jill Tracy chats with Morbid Curiosity Magazine editor Loren Rhoads
The Elegant Side of the Netherworld: Jill Tracy Interview in LA WEEKLY
Jill Tracy Interview in Sepiachord
Finding the Phantom: Jill Tracy talks music and the allure of monsters with Vampirisme
Beauty Found in Darkness: Jill Tracy interview on FEARnet
On Mystery, Music and the Mütter Museum: Jill Tracy interview in NOCTURNE Magazine
Jill Tracy discusses her work with the legendary Mütter Museum in Chain D.L.K Magazine
Dark Seductress Jill Tracy Featured as Dexter's Final Requiem: Dark Media
S.F. Musician Sees Romance in Shadows: Jill Tracy interview in San Francisco Chronicle
Elegant Alchemy: Jill Tracy interview in the Bay Guardian
Death Salon interviews Jill Tracy
Horror Addicts interviews Jill Tracy
Musical Séance and the Sublime Art of Darkness: Jill Tracy Interview in Diabolique Magazine
Waking the Dead: Jill Tracy Interview in Bay Bridged
A Glimpse Beyond the Veil: Jill Tracy Reveals The Secret Music of Lily Dale, Interview in Haute Macabre

20th-century births
Living people
American performance artists
American pop pianists
American rock pianists
American women singer-songwriters
Place of birth missing (living people)
American rock singers
American rock songwriters
American women composers
20th-century American composers
Dark cabaret musicians
Women punk rock singers
Gothic rock musicians
Year of birth missing (living people)
20th-century American women pianists
20th-century American pianists
21st-century American women pianists
21st-century American pianists
20th-century women composers
American singer-songwriters